Cheddi "Joey" Jagan Jr. is a dentist and a politician in Guyana.

Early life and family
Jagan is the son of two past Guyanese Presidents, Cheddi Jagan and Janet Jagan. His father was a Hindu Indo-Guyanese whose parents came from India to work on the plantations of Guyana. His mother was an American Ashkenazi Jew from Chicago who was of Hungarian and Romanian Jewish descent. He has a sister, Nadira Jagan-Brancier.

Political activity
In politics, he is the co-founder of the Unity Party of Guyana, a pro-capitalist party seeking to bring more foreign investment to Guyana (which made him an opposite to his parents, who were socialists).

In 2006, Jagan, joined with Peter Ramsaroop, Paul Hardy and Rupert Roopnarine to form the Guyana Third Force.  In 2011, Jagan returned to the party of his father, the People's Progressive Party (PPP), having previously been a leading critic of it, along with Ramsaroop, the leader of Vision Guyana (a political/social organization in Guyana).

Personal life
Jagan's son is Cheddi B. Jagan III, also a member of the PPP/C.

Notes

External links
  Unity Party of Guyana

Year of birth missing (living people)
Living people
Guyanese Jews
Guyanese people of Hungarian-Jewish descent
Guyanese people of Romanian descent
Jewish Guyanese politicians
People's Progressive Party (Guyana) politicians
Children of national leaders
Guyanese politicians of Indian descent

Indian people of Hungarian-Jewish descent